The Cumbria Education Trust is a multi-academy trust serving the English county of Cumbria. The schools in the trust share a common vision to enable every young person to reach their potential, maintaining their individual ethos. 
It is the Trust’s aim to not only develop the standard of education in the Cumbria region, but also aid its social and economic regeneration.

Academies
There are currently three secondary academies,
William Howard School, Brampton
Workington Academy
The Whitehaven Academy

and eight Primary School academies, 
Caldew Lea Primary School
Hensingham Primary School
Longtown Primary School
Newtown Primary School
Northside Primary School
Yewdale Primary School 
Yanwath Primary School
Tebay Primary School

in the trust.

References

Multi-academy trusts